Bloodstock may refer to:
 Bloodstock Open Air, a heavy metal music festival held in England
 Foundation bloodstock, animals that are the foundation of a breed or bloodline
 Thoroughbred horses